It's Gonna Be Right is a 1985 album by American singer Cheryl Lynn, released on Columbia Records. The album was a follow up to her successful 1983 album, Preppie. The album was also Lynn's final album for the Columbia Label. It was produced by Jimmy Jam and Terry Lewis, who had produced her hit single "Encore".

The first single, "Fidelity", though bearing similarities to Cheryl Lynn's previous Jam & Lewis-produced smash "Encore," only reached #25 on the R&B charts, its lacklustre performance was widely blamed on its predecessor still being in heavy rotation at the time of its release. Cheryl Lynn, co-wrote and produced the follow-up single "Fade To Black" herself, but it only reached #85 on the R&B charts. The Jam & Lewis helmed title track bore several sonic similarities to her smash hit "Got To Be Real." Despite employing the popular production duo, the album only reached #56 on the R&B albums chart. The album was reissued in September 2010, as an import on Sony Records Japan, however no bonus material was included. In September, 2015 it was rereleased by PTG on CD including one bonus track, the long version of "Fidelity".

Track listing
 "Fidelity" - 4:50
 "Fade to Black" - 6:32
 "Love's Been Here Before" - 3:18
 "It's Gonna Be Right" - 4:02
 "Let Me Love You" - 5:50
 "Find Somebody New" - 4:06
 "Loafin'" - 5:14
 "Slipped Me a Mickey" - 4:18
 "Tug'O'War" - 4:57

References

1985 albums
Cheryl Lynn albums
Albums produced by Jimmy Jam and Terry Lewis
Columbia Records albums